The 2016 European Aesthetic Group Gymnastics Championships, the 1st edition, was held in Tartu, Estonia, from February 11 to 14, 2016 at the A. Le Coq Sportshall.

Schedule

Feb 13 Saturday
 13:00-13:30 Opening Ceremony 
 13:30-16:00 Junior and Senior Preliminaries
 17:00-17:15 Draw for Finals

Feb 14 Sunday
 13:00-15:00 Junior and Senior Finals
 15:00-16:00 Awarding Ceremony

Medal winners

Medal table

External links
http://missvalentine.eu/results/
http://www.ifagg.com/event/agg-european-championships-agg-junior-european-championships-tartu-estonia/?instance_id=339

European Aesthetic Gymnastics Championships
European Aesthetic Gymnastics Championships